The Hyderabad Mumbai Express, also known as the Mumbai Express, is a daily train linking Hyderabad City and Mumbai. The train shares the rakes of Hussainsagar Express and follows the same route, though the latter is a superfast express. The train was earlier numbered as 17031 Mumbai – Hyderabad  Mumbai Express and 17032 Hyderabad – Mumbai Mumbai Express. From Oct 1, 2022, the train has been reclassified as a superfast express with numbers 22731 (Hyderabad-Mumbai) and 22732 (Mumbai-Hyderabad). 

22732 CSMT-HYB express contain 4 AC coaches: three three-tier AC(b1,b2, b3), one AC two-tier(a1).
22731 HYB-CSMT express contains 3 AC coaches: three three-tier AC(b1, b2, b3), one AC two-tier(a1).

Mumbai express departs Hyderabad at 10:35 PM and reaches Mumbai at 01:05 PM. Hyderabad express departs Mumbai at 02:10 PM and reaches Hyderabad Deccan at 04:30 AM. This train makes a total of 20 halts including the destination points during the journey.

Traction
As the route is fully electrified it is hauled by WAP-4 of Vijayawada Shed from end to end.

See also
 Andhra Pradesh Express
 Andhra Pradesh Sampark Kranti Express
 Hussainsagar Express

References

Transport in Mumbai
Transport in Hyderabad, India
Railway services introduced in 1962
Express trains in India
Rail transport in Telangana
Rail transport in Maharashtra
Rail transport in Karnataka